The 1976 Southern Cross Rally, officially the Total Oil Southern Cross International Rally was the eleventh running of the Southern Cross Rally. The rally took place between the 9th and the 14th of October 1976. The event covered 3,334 kilometres from Sydney to Port Macquarie.  It was won by Andrew Cowan and Fred Gocentas, driving a Mitsubishi Lancer GSR.

Results

References

Rally competitions in Australia
Southern Cross Rally